Rockingham Park was a  horse racing establishment in Salem, New Hampshire, in the United States. First built in 1906, it was used as an area for many to gamble on the weekends. Seabiscuit raced there in 1935 and 1936, and Mom's Command ran in her first race and gained her first victory there in 1984. Rockingham Park also hosted simulcasting and charity gaming. The last live horse racing at the track occurred in 2009. Rockingham Park closed its doors for good on August 31, 2016, and was sold for redevelopment of the property. The racetrack was demolished in the summer of 2017. It is currently being redeveloped as part of the Tuscan Village project.

The New Hampshire Sweepstakes (now New Hampshire Lottery) was originated in 1964 and raced here from 1964 to 1967. The race was brought back in 1984 (though not connected with sweepstakes tickets) and was the feature event of the summer racing meet.

In 1991, the Mall at Rockingham Park, currently the largest mall in northern New England, was constructed adjacent to the racetrack, and has Dick’s Sporting Goods, J. C. Penney, and Macy's (originally Jordan Marsh), for anchors. The mall is owned and managed by Simon Property Group and is not affiliated with the racetrack.

"The Finest Racecourse in the World" 
On June 28, 1906, a tiny outpost near the Salem train depot began a 21-day tenure as host to a Thoroughbred meet. Over 10,000 people from as far away as New York City flocked to the small New Hampshire town. Their rave reviews proclaimed the site "the finest racecourse in the world". Although Alyth, a two-year-old, won the first thoroughbred race at the site, gambling was still illegal at the time in New Hampshire, and betting was shut down after three days. Underground wagering continued throughout the meet, but the track sat idle for five years after the meet's conclusion; however, these humble beginnings would lead to the formation of a staple of New England culture rich with the history of the "sport of kings."

Idle years 
In between its stints as a racecourse, the site served as host to a number of historical occurrences.

The track also served as the base for the 14th US Army Corps of Engineers during World War I. The racecourse served as a bivouac for soldiers prior to voyages to France.

The racetrack was idled again when on July 29, 1980 a fire destroyed the grandstand. The track remained closed until May 26, 1984.

Motor racing venue
The establishment has hosted motorized racing. Motorcycle races were also held. With the success of the events, a  board track was built, sanctioned by the AAA, the most recognized sanctioning body of the day. A mechanic was killed in practice for the  Autumn Classic car race, which was staged on October 31, 1925. On August 21, 1926, M. L. "Curly" Fredericks, on an Altoona, set the record for the fastest speed that a motorcycle would attain on an oval board track. In 1928, the track held the final motorcycle national championships to be competed on a board track. With the rotten wood removed, the 1929 Labor Day and Columbus Day auto races held at the restored dirt track drew 45,000 and 52,000 spectators respectively.

References

Salem, New Hampshire
Sports venues in New Hampshire
Buildings and structures in Rockingham County, New Hampshire
Tourist attractions in Rockingham County, New Hampshire
Defunct horse racing venues in New Hampshire